Ausburn Birdsall (November 13, 1814 – July 10, 1903) was an American lawyer and politician who served one term as a U.S. Representative from New York from 1847 to 1849.

Biography
Born in Otego, New York, Birdsall was the son of Michael and Wealthy Webster Birdsall. He married Louisa and they had a son, Ausburn. His second wife was Eliza Reynolds Montgomery  and they had a daughter, Grace.

Career
Birdsall was a lawyer in private practice. He served as district attorney of Broome County, New York.

Congress 
Birdsall was elected as a Democrat to the Thirtieth Congress as United States Representative for the twenty-second district of New York from March 4, 1847, to March 3, 1849.  He served as supply supervisor of the United States Navy.

Death
Birdsall died in Manhattan, New York County, New York, on July 10, 1903 (age 88 years, 239 days). His original interment was at Spring Forest Cemetery, Binghamton, New York, and his reinterment in 1910 was at Woodlawn Cemetery, Bronx, New York.

References

External links

1814 births
1903 deaths
County district attorneys in New York (state)
People from Otsego County, New York
United States Navy civilians
Burials at Woodlawn Cemetery (Bronx, New York)
Democratic Party members of the United States House of Representatives from New York (state)
19th-century American politicians